Huilong Township is a township of Tongbai County in southern Henan province, China, located near the trisection of the prefecture-level cities of Nanyang, Zhumadian, and Xinyang. , it has 10 villages under its administration.

See also 
 List of township-level divisions of Henan

References 

Township-level divisions of Henan
Nanyang, Henan